Pipreola is a genus of bird in the family Cotingidae. Together with Ampelioides tschudii, they are collectively known as fruiteaters. All are restricted to humid montane or foothill forest in western or northern South America. They are thickset birds with predominantly greenish upperparts. Males of most species have black heads and/or reddish, orange or yellow to the throat, chest or belly.

Taxonomy
The genus Pipreola  was introduced in 1838 by the English naturalist William Swainson to accommodate a single species, the fiery-throated fruiteater. The genus name is a Latin diminutive of the genus Pipra that was introduced in 1764 by Carl Linnaeus.

The genus now contains 11 species:

References

 Fitzpatrick, J. W., and Hosner, P. A. (2004). Fruiteaters (Pipreola). pp. 80–84 in: del Hoyo, J., Elliott, A., & Christie, D. A. eds. (2004). Handbook of the Birds of the World. Vol. 9. Cotingas to Wagtails. Lynx Edicions, Barcelona. 

 
Cotingidae
Bird genera
Taxonomy articles created by Polbot